Sebastian Castello may refer:

 Sebastian Castello (soccer), Canadian soccer player
 Sebastian Castellio (1515-1563), sometimes known as Sebastian Castello, French preacher and theologian